Pinellia tripartita is a species of Pinellia in the Arum family (Araceae). Purported common names include green dragon (the same as other members of its genus) and voodoo lily (the same as Amorphophallus konjac). A purple variety goes by purple dragon. It is found in Japan, including Okinawa, the Korean peninsula, and infrequently in eastern China.

References

Aroideae